Olivo e Pasquale (Olivo and Pasquale) is a melodramma giocoso, a romantic comedy opera, in two acts by Gaetano Donizetti. Jacopo Ferretti wrote the Italian libretto after Antonio Simeone Sografi's play.

Performance history
It premiered on 7 January 1827 at the Teatro Valle, Rome. Donizetti made some revisions in a subsequent production in Naples for the Teatro Nuovo in September 1827, the most important of which was changing Camillo to a tenor.

Roles

Synopsis 
Time: The eighteenth century
Place: Lisbon

Olivo and Pasquale are two brothers, both merchants from Lisbon: the first is hot-blooded and brutal, the other is sweet and shy. Olivo's daughter, Isabella, loves a young apprentice, Camillo, but her father wants her to marry a wealthy merchant from Cadiz, Le Bross. Isabella tells Le Bross that she loves another. At first he is led to believe that it is Columella, an old conceited and ridiculous man, but shortly after he understands that it is Camillo. Olivo, realizing that his daughter dares to oppose his will, is furious and Le Bross, shocked by his disproportionate reaction, becomes Isabella and Camillo's ally and promises to help them get married. The lovers threaten to commit suicide at five o'clock if Olivo doesn't agree to let the marriage take place, but he does not believe them and he refuses to be blackmailed. However, at five o'clock,  shots of a firearm ring out: Pasquale faints and Olivo says that now he would have preferred Isabella to be Camillo's wife rather than be dead. The threat of suicide was not true, and the young couple appears at the door; Olivo embraces and blesses their union.

Recordings

References
Notes

Cited sources
Osborne, Charles, (1994),  The Bel Canto Operas of Rossini, Donizetti, and Bellini,  Portland, Oregon: Amadeus Press. 

Other sources
Allitt, John Stewart (1991), Donizetti: in the light of Romanticism and the teaching of Johann Simon Mayr, Shaftesbury: Element Books, Ltd (UK); Rockport, MA: Element, Inc.(USA)
Ashbrook, William (1982), Donizetti and His Operas, Cambridge University Press.  
Ashbrook, William (1998), "Donizetti, Gaetano" in Stanley Sadie  (Ed.),  The New Grove Dictionary of Opera, Vol. One. London: Macmillan Publishers, Inc.   
Ashbrook, William and Sarah Hibberd (2001), in  Holden, Amanda (Ed.), The New Penguin Opera Guide, New York: Penguin Putnam. .  pp. 224 – 247.
Loewenberg, Alfred (1970). Annals of Opera, 1597-1940, 2nd edition.  Rowman and Littlefield
Sadie, Stanley, (Ed.); John Tyrell (Exec. Ed.) (2004), The New Grove Dictionary of Music and Musicians.  2nd edition. London: Macmillan.    (hardcover).   (eBook).
 Waidelich, T. G. (1997), 'in dem Vaterlande der Haydn, der Mozarte und so vieler andern berühmten Componisten'. Ein unbekannter Brief Gaetano Donizettis betreffend den Vertrieb seiner Opera buffa Olivo e Pasquale in Deutschland. In: Semantische Inseln – Musikalisches Festland für Tibor Kneif zum 65. Geburtstag, Hamburg 1997, p. 57–62.
 Weinstock, Herbert (1963), Donizetti and the World of Opera in Italy, Paris, and Vienna in the First Half of the Nineteenth Century, New York: Pantheon Books.

External links
 Donizetti Society (London) website
Libretto (Italian)

Italian-language operas
Operas by Gaetano Donizetti
Operas
1827 operas
Operas set in Portugal
Operas based on plays